Boppelsen is a municipality in the district of Dielsdorf in the canton of Zürich in Switzerland.

History

Boppelsen is first mentioned in 1130 as de Bobpinsolo.

Geography
Of this area, 42.6% is used for agricultural purposes, while 47.4% is forested. Of the rest of the land, 9.7% is settled (buildings or roads) and the remainder (0.3%) is non-productive (rivers, glaciers or mountains).

The municipality is located in the hills above the Furttal.

Demographics
, 11.2% of the population was made up of foreign nationals. Over the last 10 years the population has grown at a rate of 41.7%. Most of the population speaks German  (92.2%), with Portuguese being second most common ( 2.7%) and French being third ( 0.7%).

In the 2007 election the most popular party was the SVP which received 39.8% of the vote.  The next three most popular parties were the FDP (16.9%), the CSP (15.1%) and the SPS (10.3%).

The age distribution of the population is children and teenagers (0–19 years old) make up 21.6% of the population, while adults (20–64 years old) make up 68.4% and seniors (over 64 years old) make up 10%.  About 87.8% of the population (between age 25-64) have completed either non-mandatory upper secondary education or additional higher education (either university or a Fachhochschule).

Boppelsen has an unemployment rate of 1.44%.  , there were 112 people employed in the primary economic sector and about 17 businesses involved in this sector.  21 people are employed in the secondary sector and there are 8 businesses in this sector.  82 people are employed in the tertiary sector, with 31 businesses in this sector.
The historical population is given in the following table:

References

External links 

  
 

Municipalities of the canton of Zürich